The 2017–18 I-League 2nd Division (known as Hero 2017–18 I-League 2nd Division, for sponsorship reasons) was the 11th season of the I-League 2nd Division, the second division Indian football league, since its establishment in 2008. The season started with the preliminary rounds from 14 March to 15 May 2018. The final round of the league took place between 21 May to 30 May 2018 at FSV Arena, Bengaluru.

This season featured 18 teams, divided into three groups of six teams each. The season also featured the reserve sides of seven Indian Super League clubs, none of which were eligible to qualify for the final round. Real Kashmir won the title on 30 May 2018 and earned the promotion to 2018–19 I-League. They also made history becoming first team from state of Jammu & Kashmir to enter the first division of I-League

Format
Just like the previous season, the I-League 2nd Division will feature a preliminary round and a final round. During the preliminary round, the 18 teams will be divided into three groups of six teams each. All the matches during the preliminary round will be played in a double round-robin basis, in which every team plays all others in their group once at home and once away. The winners of the three groups, along with the best second placed team, will qualify for the final round. The seven Indian Super League reserve sides in the league will not be eligible to qualify for the final round.

During the final round, the four teams will face each other in a single-leg league system at a neutral venue, where each team faces each other once. At the end of the round, the team in first will earn promotion to the next division of Indian football.

Teams

Stadiums and locations

Personnel and kits

Foreign players
Each club, excluding the Indian Super League reserve sides, can register three foreign players in their squad. One of the foreign players has to be from an AFC Member Nation.

Preliminary round

Group A

Fixtures and results

Group B

Fixtures and results

Group C

Fixtures and results

Final round

Fixtures and results

Season statistics

Top scorers

Clean sheets

Highest Attendances

References

External links
 Official I-League website.

I-League 2nd Division seasons
2017–18 in Indian football leagues